Apollo Engineering College (AEC) is a private, self-financing, co-educational institution approved by the All India Council for Technical Education (AICTE) and is affiliated to the Anna University. AEC was established in 2007. This institution has a built up area of about 2,00,000 sq.feet and has been fully finished. The floors are furnished and there is a garden. All departments have smart rooms that are equipped with most modern teaching aids like LCD projectors, OHP, multimedia computer systems and audio/video devices.

The college offers six undergraduate programmes and three postgraduate programmes.

Programmes offered

Engineering and Technology (4 Years)	

B.E - Mechanical Engineering

AEC Amenities
 Centers of Excellence

Sports
The Department of Physical Education encourages students to participate in higher level sports and games competition and Fitness Activities. The sports complex includes facilities for Hi-tech volleyball, basketball, and Throw ball courts, Three cricket nets with automatic wall Dispenser, kabaddi and athletic tracks.

Hostel Facilities
The Apollo Engineering College hostel is a residence for about 300 boys and 250 girls. There are two separate hostel buildings, one for the girls and the other for the boys. The Hostel is managed by the Hostel Committee which is constituted by the resident faculties of the college and the Warden in consultation with the college management.

Hostel Amenities
Kitchens run under direct supervision of management.
One cafeteria
Indoor games like carom, etc.
Hostel day celebrations every year.

Library Facilities 
The library has a large collection of books covering various branches of engineering sciences and Technology also Science and Humanities and its related fields. The library receives regularly Journals, News letters from following organizations and societies and provides the staff and students latest information's in technical education, research and development activities.
Computer Society of India (CSI)
Confederation of Indian Industry (CII) 
Indian Society for Technical Education (ISTE) 
Institute of Electrical and Electronics Engineers (IEEE)
The Institution of Electronics and Telecommunication Engineers (IETE) 
The Institution of Engineers (India)

The college also provides the learning access to NPTEL (National Program Technology Enhanced Learning) through online web and web video courses in engineering.

The library has a total collection of approximately 5000 book titles relating to various engineering disciplines. The library subscribes about 100 titles of Journals and technical magazines and receives 7 dailies. Online Journals subscribed are as follows:

DELNET E-Journal Package (275 no's with full text)
IEEE-ASPP subscription mainly for circuit branches.
ASME subscription mainly for non-circuit branches.

Professional Societies

 Indian Society for Technical Education (ISTE)
 Computer Society of India (CSI)
 Confederation of Indian Industry (CII)
 The Institution of Electronics and Telecommunication Engineers  (IETE)
 Institution of Engineers (IE)

Transport
The College has a fleet of 8buses(Only specific route in chennai), to transport students and staff from Chennai to college and back. These buses operate along 8 routes starting from different points approximately between 5.30 and 6.00 a.m. The college transport department provides punctual service, besides ensuring safety and security to the students.

Internet 
The college has a dedicated internet lab working 24 hours a day, 7 days a week, as well as free internet access for students. All the departments and the HODs have internet connectivity.

Training & Placement
The training & Placement service operates year-round to facilitate contacts between companies & Graduates. The service offers advice on placement procedures, group discussions, mock interviews, and aid in preparing application and resumes.

Moreover, the Training & Placement Cell conducts various classes on aptitude, verbal reasoning, group discussions etc. in the name of Career Development Programme (CDP classes).

Corporate Social Responsibilities

National Service Scheme is a central programme run with an aim of "Personality development through social service". The scheme aims at creating social awareness in college students regarding the issues and problems of the community.

Other Facilities within the campus 
 Reprography

References

External links
 

Engineering colleges in Chennai
Colleges affiliated to Anna University